Masahiro Komatsu (born April 22, 1984)  is a Japanese basketball player who plays for Japan men's national 3x3 team.  He played college basketball for the University of Tsukuba.

Awards and honors
3x3 Central Europe Tour 2019 - Chance 3x3 Tour Jindřichův Hradec Champions

References

External links

1984 births
Living people
Japanese men's basketball players
Japan national 3x3 basketball team players
Sportspeople from Miyagi Prefecture
Forwards (basketball)